Claude Clarence Crabb (March 8, 1940 – February 8, 2021) was an American professional football player who was a cornerback in the National Football League (NFL). He played college football for the USC Trojans.

Early life
Crabb was a football quarterback, basketball player and track sprinter at Monterey Union High School 1954–58.

College years
He played college football at the University of Colorado after transferring from the University of Southern California and was drafted in the 27th round of the 1962 AFL Draft by the Buffalo Bills.

Professional career
Crabb was a defensive back in the National Football League for the Washington Redskins (1962–63) where he made six interceptions in 1962, Philadelphia Eagles (1964–65), and the Los Angeles Rams (1966–68).

Death
Crabb died from COVID-19 on February 8, 2021, aged 80, during the COVID-19 pandemic in California.

References

1940 births
2021 deaths
American football cornerbacks
Colorado Buffaloes football players
Los Angeles Rams players
People from Carmel-by-the-Sea, California
Philadelphia Eagles players
USC Trojans football players
Washington Redskins players
Players of American football from California
Deaths from the COVID-19 pandemic in California